Michał Rapcewicz (born 10 March 1982 in Wałbrzych) is a Polish dressage rider. He represented Poland at the 2008 Summer Olympics in the individual dressage, finishing in 22nd place, and then represented Poland at the 2012 Summer Olympics in the team (finishing in 8th place) and individual dressage (finishing in 45th place).

References

External links
Official site

Living people
1982 births
Polish male equestrians
Polish dressage riders
Olympic equestrians of Poland
Equestrians at the 2008 Summer Olympics
Equestrians at the 2012 Summer Olympics
People from Wałbrzych
Sportspeople from Lower Silesian Voivodeship